"LOL!" is a song by Japanese fashion model, actress and musician Meisa Kuroki, released as her third physical single in early October, 2010. The song, as of 2010, is her most popular single, outselling her other singles in terms of physical copies, and also being her only single to receive a digital download certification from RIAJ.

Promotion

The song was used in commercials for Kit Kats in Japan, in 2010. Kuroki set up an official Twitter account, https://twitter.com/Meisa_Kuroki, on September 7 in promotion for the single. Originally, Kuroki intended to only use the Twitter account for a month, until October 7, however is currently still using the service. She promoted the single with two handshake events on October 9 held on the same day, one in Shinjuku, Tokyo and one in Nishinomiya.

Kuroki appeared on TV shows Music Lovers, Music Japan and Sakigake! Ongaku Banzuke Eight in promotion of the event. She also appeared on radio shows on Tokyo FM, most notably Love Connection four times throughout October. Kuroki was featured in many magazines to promote the single, such as 25ans, Floor, Nikkei Magazine, Gyao Magazine, Ori Star, Sweet and WWD Japan.

Music video 

The music video was directed by Shigeaki Kubo. It was initially aired on the internet on September 11, for a limited period of 24 hours. The video features Kuroki in a summery room, reclined on the floor reading a magazine, along with several other girls. Interspersed with these scenes are Kuroki and two back-up dancers in a monochrome room, as well as scenes inside a red cluttered room, in which Kuroki stands in a bath-tub. Occasional 3D speech bubbles appear with the lyrics of the song around Kuroki, as well as other computer graphics.

Track listing

Chart rankings

Sales and certifications

Personnel

D.O.I. (Daimonion Recordings) - Mixing
June (Wazz Up) - all instruments, music, production, programming, vocal production
Kaoru Kami - lyrics
Neeraj Khajanchi (Nippon no Kokoro Sound) - Recording, at Studio Empoint
Meisa Kuroki - vocals

Release history

References 

2010 singles
Japanese-language songs
Meisa Kuroki songs
2010 songs